Shifting Gears is a 2018 American comedy-drama film written by R. Keith Harris, directed by Jason Winn and starring Harris, Brooke Langton, Adam Hicks, C. Thomas Howell and John Ratzenberger.

Cast
R. Keith Harris as Tom Williamson
Brooke Langton as Carol Williamson
Adam Hicks as Jeremy Williamson
C. Thomas Howell as Jenkins
John Ratzenberger as Conrad Baines
M.C. Gainey as Dirty Harry Hawkins
M. Emmet Walsh as Hank

Release
The film was released on March 23, 2018.

Reception
Renee Longstreet of Common Sense Media awarded the film two stars out of five.  Alan Ng of Film Threat awarded the film three stars out of five.

Gary Goldstein of the Los Angeles Times gave the film a negative review and wrote, "Dirt track racing may have its fans, but in Shifting Gears it doesn’t prove a particularly exciting arena around which to build a heartland-friendly family comedy."

References

External links
 
 

American comedy-drama films